{{DISPLAYTITLE:Tau1 Eridani}}

Tau1 Eridani, Latinized from τ1 Eridani, is a binary star system in the constellation Eridanus. It has an apparent magnitude of 4.46, making it visible to the naked eye in suitably dark conditions. This a spectroscopic binary with an orbital period of 958 days. It is located about 46 light years from the Earth. At present, the system is moving away from the Sun with a radial velocity of +26 km/s.

Tau1 Eridani was a latter designation of 90 Ceti.

Debris disk 

A moderate far-infrared excess was observed for this star system, in the 12μm, 25μm, 60μm and 100μm wavelengths, by the Infrared Astronomical Satellite (IRAS), and published in 1993. This discovery was subsequently interpreted as indicating a debris disk with a radius near to 500 AU. It was further speculated that, if the star system had been observed at longer wavelengths, it was likely the debris disk would have been seen to have a radius considerably wider than 500 AU.

Later observations made by the Spitzer Space Telescope, published in 2004, detected no substantial infrared excess around the stars, within the 14-35μm range of wavelengths.

References

F-type main-sequence stars
Spectroscopic binaries
Eridanus (constellation)
Eridani, Tau1
Durchmusterung objects
Eridani, 01
0111
017206
012843
0818